Makhmudov is a masculine surname common in the former Soviet countries, its feminine counterpart is Makhmudova. It may refer to
Dilshod Mahmudov (born 1982), Uzbekistani boxer 
Emin Makhmudov (born 1992), Azerbaijani-Russian football player 
 Iskander Makhmudov (born 1963), Uzbek-born Russian businessman and philanthropist
Khurshed Makhmudov (born 1982), Tajikistani football player
Nado Makhmudov (1907–1990), Armenian-born Kurdish writer